James Ferd Olney (1 August 1914 – 14 September 1944), sometimes written as James Fred Olney, was an English professional footballer who played in the Football League for Birmingham and Swindon Town. He was killed on active service with the Coldstream Guards during the Second World War.

Life and career

Olney was born in 1914 in St Bartholomew's Parish, Birmingham, the son of James Ferd Olney, a brass fitter, and his wife Harriet Florence née Brown. He had an older sister, Ivy May. His father's younger brother, Ben Olney, played football as a goalkeeper for Derby County, Aston Villa and England.

Olney played local football for clubs including Tyseley Rangers, Longbridge Albion, Newbridge Athletic and Redditch before joining First Division club Birmingham in March 1936. He began his Birmingham career with the reserve team in the Central League, and despite scoring an own goal against Sheffield Wednesday's reserves at the end of AprilBirmingham won the match 8–3he was given his first-team and Football League debut a few days later in the last game of the 1935–36 season, a 3–1 home defeat against West Bromwich Albion.

He began the 1936–37 season back in the Birmingham Combination as captain of Birmingham's "A" team. He played twice for the first team that season, once in January and once in April, standing in for Tom Fillingham at centre half, but made no further appearances. He underwent knee cartilage surgery in January 1938, but even without the injury, he had been unable to displace Fillingham from the regular starting eleven: they played in a similar style, but Olney "lacked the destructive abilities" of the more experienced man. Fillingham was given a free transfer at the end of the season, while Olney was retained. Several men were used at centre-half in the first few months of the 1938–39 season, but Olney was not, and in December 1938 he moved to Third Division South club Swindon Town.

Olney played twice for Swindon's Southern League team before making his first-team debut on 17 December, coming into the side at left half in place of the injured Stan Wilcockson to face Exeter City at home. Swindon won 2–1, and, according to the Football Pink, Olney "seemed to be on the slow side at the start, but he speeded up appreciably and his distribution of the ball was of a high order." He made eight more appearances over the next couple of months before Wilcockson regained possession of the left-half position until his injured ankle allowed Olney to play in the last match of the season. His powerful free kick was headed home by Ben Morton to open the scoring in a 3–1 win against Torquay United that secured his team a ninth-place finish. He played in the first three matches of the 1939–40 season, which was then abandoned because of the Second World War.

Olney returned to Birmingham, where the 1939 Register lists him as a professional footballer and Birmingham City Police reservist living with his widowed mother, a canteen worker, and his sister, a sewing machinist, in Colonial Road, Bordesley Green. He left the police at his own request in June 1940, and joined the Army. Olney served as a Lance-Serjeant in the 5th Battalion, Coldstream Guards, and was killed in action near the Dutch–Belgian border on 14 September 1944, at the age of 30. He was buried in Geel War Cemetery and commemorated at the County Ground, Swindon.

Career statistics

Notes

References

Sources

External links
 Profile at Swindon-Town-FC.co.uk

1914 births
1944 deaths
Footballers from Birmingham, West Midlands
English footballers
Association football wing halves
Redditch United F.C. players
Birmingham City F.C. players
Swindon Town F.C. players
English Football League players
Southern Football League players
Coldstream Guards soldiers
British Army personnel killed in World War II
Military personnel from Birmingham, West Midlands